Rachel Laurin (born August 11, 1961) is a Canadian organist, composer and music educator living in Quebec.

She was born in Saint-Benoît. In 1985, she received the McAbbie Foundation scholarship and, in the following year, the Bourse d'excellence Wilfrid-Pelletier. She has performed in Canada, the United States and France. She has received the Conrad-Letendre scholarship five times. From 1986 to 2002, she was assistant organist at Saint Joseph's Oratory. In 1988, she started teaching at the Conservatoire de musique du Québec à Montréal. From 2002 to 2006, she was titular organist at Notre Dame Cathedral in Ottawa. 

Laurin started composition lessons at age 19 with Raymond Daveluy. She has been the "house composer" at Wayne Leupold Editions since 2006. Laurin currently only composes commissioned pieces. Her very first commissioned piece was requested by Donald Sutherland and his wife Phyllis Bryn-Julson. The piece was premiered at an AGO regional convention in Pittsburgh in 1987.

In 2008, she received the Holtkamp-AGO Composition Award. In 2009, she was awarded first place in the Marilyn Mason New Organ Music Competition. Laurin won the 2022 Pogorzelski-Yankee Composition Competition. 

The American Guild of Organists granted her their Distinguished Composer Award in 2020.

Selected compositions 
 Messe pour les fêtes solennelles Opus 4 (1983)
 Messe de louange, Opus 15 (1990)
 Opus 17 for viola, flute, and piano (1990)
 Opus 18 for chamber ensemble (1990
 String Quartet, Opus 19 (1991)
 Concerto in D for Organ, String Orchestra and Timpani, op. 59

Solo Organ Works
 Suite Brève, Op. 6 (1988)
 Sonate en Fa, Op. 7 
 Hommage à Lucien Daveluy, Op. 13
 Scènes vosgiennes, Op. 16 (1989)
 Prèlude, Op. 24
 Variations sur un Noël Lorrain, Op. 26 (1995)
 Quatre Pèlerinages en Lorraine, Op. 30 (1996)
 Trois Pièces, Op. 31 (2012)
 Symphonie No. 1, Op. 36 (2008)
 Acclamations, Op. 37
 Étude Héroïque, Op. 38 (2012)
 Petite Suite sur un Motet de Gerald Bales, Op. 41 (2005)
 Douze courtes Pièces, Op. 43
 Volume 1 (2006)
 Volume 2 (2010)
 Volume 3, Op. 64 (2014)
 Volume 4, Op. 68 (2016)
 Volume 5, Op. 75 (2018)
Introduction and Passacaglia on a Theme by Raymond Daveluy, Op. 44 (2011)
Prélude et Fugue en Fa Mineur, Op. 45 (2008)
Partita on "Nun danket," Op. 47 (2009)
Épilogue, Op. 50 (2014)
Royal Canadian Fanfare, Op. 53 (2012)
Trois Bagatelles, Op. 54
Symphonie No. 2, Op. 55 
Greensboro Suite, Op. 56 (2011)
Sept Pièces, Op. 58 (2012)
Berceuse à Pierre, Op. 61
Fantaisie et Fugue sur le Psaume Genevois 47, Op. 62
Suite in D major for Don Menzies, Op. 63
Étude-Caprice "Le Rire de Belzébuth," Op. 66 (2016)
Poème Symphonique pour le Temps de l'Avent, Op. 69 (2017)
Étude Symphonique pour Pédale Solo, Op. 72 (2016)
Fantaisie et Fugue en Ré Majeur, Op. 73
Aria et Fugue pour Aaron, Op. 74
Three Impressions of Kingsfold
Humoresque (Hommage à Marcel Dupré), Op. 77
Finale, Op. 78 (2018)
Pièce de Concert, No. 1, Op. 79
Pièce de Concert (Hommage à Buxtehude), No. 2, Op. 86
Sonate pour orgue, No. 1, Op. 91
Ten Little Sketches for Ten Little Fingers, Op. 92
Petit Triptyque, Op. 93
Concert Piece No. 3 (Mr. Mistoffelees Overture), Op. 94
Fantasia quasi scherzo, Op. 95
Concert Piece No. 4 (Sweelinck Variations), Op. 96
Concert Piece No. 5 (Tone Poem in Honour of Saint Benedict on "Gaudeamus" and "Laeta Dies"), Op. 97
Étude-Esquisse (Bagatelle burlesque, Hommage à Beethoven) No. 2, Op. 98
Cantabile à Deux, Op. 99 (duet)
Thirteen Easy Pieces, Op. 100
Concert Piece No. 6 (Fantasy and Fugue on a Swedish Folk Song), Op. 102
Concert Piece No. 7 (Toccata for a Great Space), Op. 103
Diptych, Op. 107

References

External links 

 Rachel Laurin Official Website

1961 births
Living people
Canadian organists
Women organists
Canadian composers
Canadian music educators
Women music educators
21st-century organists
21st-century women musicians
Canadian women composers